This is a list of episodes for Hot Wheels Battle Force 5, an animated series. The series premiered on August 29, 2009 in North America.

Series overview

Series episodes

Season 1 (2009–10)

Season 2: Fused (2010–11)

References

Hot Wheels
Hot Wheels Battle Force
Hot Wheels Battle Force